100 Greatest is a long-running TV strand on Channel 4 in the United Kingdom that has been broadcasting from 11 September 1999 to 10 October 2015, originating in Tyne Tees Television’s Factual Features department under Executive Producer Mark Robinson. The "list show" programmes are generally public polls, and reflect the votes of visitors to the Channel 4 website. However, the results of some of the polls are determined by experts. The programmes are usually broadcast in the weekend schedule, in three- or four-hour blocks, throughout the year. Although the strand has never been officially retired, there have been no new editions since 2015. They are also repeated on E4 on Saturday nights or on Sunday nights.

Episodes

References

1999 British television series debuts
2015 British television series endings
2000s British television series
2010s British television series
British television specials
Channel 4 original programming
English-language television shows
Television series by ITV Studios
Television series by All3Media
Television series by Banijay
Top television lists
British television-related lists
Channel 4 documentary series